Ennai Thalatta Varuvala is 2003 Indian Tamil-language film directed by K. S. Ravindran and produced by P. M. Vedimuthu, who also wrote the story. The film stars Vignesh and Reshma, with Ajith in a cameo appearance.

Plot 
The film centers around Vennila's connections with the three men in her life. Satish wins a college competition and becomes the object of Vennila's ire. In a fit of pique, Vennila feigns love to him, gets him to marry her, and then ditches him on the wedding night. The whole affair leaves Satish in a state of shock, and he is later hospitalized and gets into a deep coma. Santhosh is a new entrant to the college. He chooses Vennila for his games of one-upmanship, leaving her puzzled as to his motive. Amar is Vennila's fiancé from abroad. She later realizes that he is a psychopath. Vennila later finds that she is pregnant, and is shocked since she has not had a physical relationship with any of the men. Soon, she realizes that it was the past catching up with her, and it was a planned vendetta by Satish's dear ones.

Cast 
Vignesh as Santhosh
Reshma as Vennila
Amar Siddique as Amar
Jai Ganesh
Ramji
Ajith as Satish (cameo appearance)

Production 
The film was earlier titled as Vennila, after the name of the character portrayed by Reshma. The film began production works in 1995 and the project was duly delayed due to financial problems with the film finally releasing in March 2003.

Reception 
AllIndianSite.com wrote, "The story seems ridiculous. The director completely failed to convince the viewers", though the critic praised the performances of Vignesh, Reshma and Ajith. Malini Mannath wrote for Chennai Online, "The film [...] has been years in the making and the script has undergone changes along the way. Not surprisingly it has a faded look". Malathi Rangarajan of The Hindu wrote, "The storyline is an attempt at being different. And that is about the only positive of [Ennai Thalatta Varuvala]", adding that "But nothing makes an impact because the flawed screenplay and direction makes watching [Ennai Thalatta Varuvala] a tiring exercise".

References

External links 
 

2000s Tamil-language films
2003 films